John Roland Houghton (born 9 September 1945) is a Zimbabwean politician who is currently serving as the Member of Parliament for Kariba. He was first elected in the 2018 Zimbabwean general election as a member of the Movement for Democratic Change – Tsvangirai (MDC–T). He previously served as the Mayor of Kariba.

Early life 
John Houghton was born on September 9, 1945 in Salisbury, Southern Rhodesia (now Harare, Zimbabwe). He is of English descent.

Career 
Houghton worked as an electrical engineer prior to being elected the Mayor of Kariba in 2003. In the 2018 Zimbabwean general election, he was elected to represent Kariba in the Parliament of Zimbabwe.

References 

1945 births
21st-century Zimbabwean politicians
Mayors of places in Zimbabwe
Members of the National Assembly of Zimbabwe
Movement for Democratic Change – Tsvangirai politicians
People from Harare
People from Mashonaland West Province
White Rhodesian people
White Zimbabwean politicians
Zimbabwean people of English descent
Living people